The District Panchayaths are the tertiary level of local government under Panchayathi Raj act in India. Idukki District Panchayath is in Kerala state in India. It was established in 1995 in accordance with Kerala Panchayath Raj Act 1994. The District Panchayat Samithi is functioning as a local governing body. Its members are elected by people from each electoral division. The Electoral college is based on the universal suffrage. Currently, this Block Panchayat has 13 electoral division. Idukki District Panchayath has same jurisdiction as of Idukki District. The State Election Commission is responsible for conducting these elections.

Block Panchayaths in jurisdiction 
 Adimali
 Azhutha
 Devikulam
 Elamdesham
 Idukki
 Kattapana
 Nedumkandam
 Thodupuzha

Politics

2020-2025 Council

2015-2020 Council

2010-2015 Council

2005-2010 Council

2000-2005 Council

See also
 2020 Kerala local body elections
 2015 Kerala local body elections
 Devikulam (State Assembly constituency)
 Idukki (State Assembly constituency)
 Peerumade (State Assembly constituency)
 Thodupuzha (Assembly constituency)
 Udumbanchola (State Assembly constituency)
 Idukki (Lok Sabha constituency)
 Local government in India

References

Local government in Kerala